Keshav Mahavidyalaya, also known as KMV, is a constituent college of the University of Delhi located in the northwest residential area of Pitam Pura.

It was established by the Government of Delhi in August, 1994. When the college was established, its campus was a school building in the northwest residential area of Keshav Puram. The college admits only undergraduates and awards degrees under the purview of the University of Delhi.

Rankings 
It is ranked 77th across india by National Institutional Ranking Framework in 2020.

Campus

The foundation stone of the new campus building was laid by former Chief Minister of Delhi, Smt. Shiela Dixit on 23 March 2003. The campus building was inaugurated by former Lt. Governor B.L. Joshi on 27 November 2005. The students began to be admitted from the academic session of 2006-07 with inclusion of new courses like Maths (H), Psychology (H) and BMS.

Hostel
The campus comprises a girl's hostel beside the campus building. It can accommodate 75 students on a twin sharing basis. The hostel provides a messdeck facility.

Sports
KMV lays emphasis on 'all-round' development of students. To accomplish this, the college manages a full-size ground, which accommodates sports like Football, Handball, Athletics etc. However, there is no cricket pitch and badminton court in the college. The college conducts a Sports Day in last week of March or first week of April every year.

KMV boasts a separate sports room which contains a table-tennis room and a fully functional unisex gym.

External links
Official Website
Kmv

References

Universities and colleges in Delhi
Educational institutions established in 1994
New Delhi
1994 establishments in Delhi